Sverre Cristiansen Kolterud (March 15, 1908, Nordre Land – November 7, 1996) was a Norwegian Nordic combined skier who competed in the 1930s.

He was born in Dokka and died in Oslo.

Kolterud won two silver medals in the individual event at the FIS Nordic World Ski Championships (1931, 1934).

At the 1932 Winter Olympics in Lake Placid, New York he finished 4th in the individual event.

External links

Sverre Kolterud's profile at Sports Reference.com

1908 births
1996 deaths
People from Nordre Land
Norwegian male Nordic combined skiers
Olympic Nordic combined skiers of Norway
Nordic combined skiers at the 1932 Winter Olympics
FIS Nordic World Ski Championships medalists in Nordic combined
Sportspeople from Innlandet
20th-century Norwegian people